Romani may refer to:

Ethnicities

 Romani people, an ethnic group of Northern Indian origin, living dispersed in Europe, the Americas and Asia
 Romani genocide, under Nazi rule
 Romani language, any of several Indo-Aryan languages of the Romani people
 Romanichal, Romani subgroup in the British Isles

People
 Romani (name), list of people with the name

Other uses
 Battle of Romani, near the Egyptian town of the same name
Romani (grape), another name for the Italian wine grape Trebbiano

See also
List of Romani people
Names of the Romani people
Rom (disambiguation)
Roma (disambiguation)
 Români (disambiguation)
Romani ite domum, corrected Latin phrase for graffiti shown in the film Monty Python's Life of Brian

Language and nationality disambiguation pages